50 Street is the designated name of two major arterial roads in east Edmonton, Alberta. Separated by the North Saskatchewan River, it is mostly straight, and runs the entire south-north length of Edmonton as well as the suburb of Beaumont. The Yellowhead Trail and 50 Street junction is the start of Highway 15, it then goes north to Manning Drive, which it follows from there. Highway 814 used follow 50 Street between Edmonton and Beaumont, until the Beaumont government took control of the road. The northside section of 50 Street is presently segmented by the developing community of Cy Becker with grading in place for a future interchange at Anthony Henday Drive; however, there is no timeline for construction.

Prior to Whitemud Drive being extended to Anthony Henday Drive (Highway 216), 50 Street between Whitemud Drive and Sherwood Park Freeway was designated as part of Highway 14.

Neighbourhoods
List of neighbourhoods 50 Street runs through, in order from south to north.

Beaumont

Edmonton
Southside

Northside

Major intersections
This is a list of major intersections, starting at the south end of 50 Street.

See also 

 List of streets in Edmonton
 Transportation in Edmonton

References

Roads in Edmonton